Calimete is a municipality and town in the Matanzas Province of Cuba. It was founded in 1867 by José Antonio Castañeda.

Demographics
In 2004, the municipality of Calimete had a population of 29,736.

See also
Municipalities of Cuba
List of cities in Cuba

References

External links

Populated places in Matanzas Province